A bumbulum, or bombulum, was a musical instrument described in an apocryphal letter of St. Jerome to Caius Posthumus Dardanus, and illustrated in a series of illuminated manuscripts of the 10th to the 11th century, together with other instruments described in the same letter. These are the Psalter of Emmeran, 10th century, described by Martin Gerbert, who gives a few illustrations from it; the Cotton manuscript of Tiberius C. VI in the British Museum, 11th century; the famous Boulogne Psalter, A.D. 1000; and the Psalter of Angers, 9th century.

In the Cotton manuscript the instrument consists of an angular frame, from which depends by a chain a rectangular metal plate having twelve bent arms attached in two rows of three on each side, one above the other. The arms appear to terminate in small rectangular bells or plates, and it is supposed that the standard frame was intended to be shaken like a sistrum in order to set the bells jangling. Sebastian Virdung gives illustrations of these instruments of Jerome, and among them of the one called bumbulum in the Cotton Manuscript, which Virdung calls Fistula Hieronimi. The general outline is the same, but instead of metal arms there is the same number of bent pipes with conical bore. Virdung explains, following the apocryphal letter, that the stand resembling the draughtsman's square represents the Holy Cross, the rectangular object dangling therefrom signifies Christ on the Cross, and the twelve pipes are the twelve apostles. Virdung's illustration, probably copied from an older work in manuscript, conforms more closely to the text of the letter than does the instrument in the Cotton manuscript. There is no evidence whatever of the actual existence of such an instrument during the Middle Ages, with the exception of this series of fanciful pictures drawn to illustrate an instrument known from description only.

The word bombulum was probably derived from the same root as the bombaulios of Aristophanes (Acharnians, 866), a comic compound for a bag-pipe with a play on an insect that hums or buzzes. The original described in the letter, also from hearsay, was probably an early type of organ.

According to one source, it may be named due to its sound resembling that of flatulence: Hemingstone cites this old Latin extract from the Liber Feodorum or Book of Fees.

References

Metal percussion instruments
Medieval musical instruments